Douglas Mark Brochu (born September 29, 1990) is an American actor, comedian and producer. He is best known as Grady Mitchell in the Disney Channel Original Series, Sonny with a Chance and So Random!. Doug has an older brother, Chris Brochu, who is notable for his role as Ray Beech in the Disney Channel Original Movie Lemonade Mouth.

Early life 
Brochu was born in Tennessee the son of Nita and Michael Brochu. He has an older brother, Chris Brochu, and a younger sister, Kaitlyn Brochu. When he was only 4 years old, Brochu moved to Fayetteville, North Carolina, where he spent most of his childhood, before moving to Orlando, Florida, where he started taking acting classes and doing local theater. In August 2006, he moved to Los Angeles with his family to pursue acting.

Career
Brochu has appeared in stage productions of My Fair Lady, Smokey Mountain Christmas, The Play's the Thing and Forever Broadway. He has also had guest starring roles on Nickelodeon's Zoey 101 and iCarly. Brochu played the main role as Grady Mitchell in Sonny with a Chance and in So Random!. Brochu also played in a special guest role as Oogie in Disney XD's Pair of Kings. In 2011, Brochu was part of Disney's Friends for Change Games, which aired on Disney Channel. After So Random! was cancelled, Brochu hosted AwesomenessTV's web series Shove It, as well as two episodes of How To Be Awesome.

Since then, Brochu has appeared in several short films and theater productions, as well as started the sketch comedy group Burnt Quiche in 2017. In 2018, he starred in the interactive live show Kid Claw on Twitch, playing the titular character.

In 2021, Brochu reprised his role as Duke Lubberman in the iCarly reboot.

Personal life 
Brochu's hobbies include reading, writing, playing videogames, playing banjo, blacksmithing, leather-crafting and brewing. From 2012 to 2013, he co-hosted a podcast called Beardomancy 101 with friend Ryan Moran, where they would discuss adventures, comics, movies and geek culture in general.

In 2016, he moved to New York City to start a business, All-Wise Meadery, alongside actor Dylan Sprouse. In September 2016, they started an interactive D&D show called Pug Crawl, which went on until March 2017. The premise consisted of weekly D&D games where viewers would choose which characters and scenarios would be featured. In November 2018, Brochu announced he was leaving All-Wise.

Brochu lives with his girlfriend, actress Caroline Dunaway. He currently works as a live broadcast producer at Esports Engine.

Filmography

Television

Film

Music video

References

External links

1990 births
Male actors from North Carolina
American male child actors
21st-century American male actors
American male television actors
People from Fayetteville, North Carolina
Living people